Paul Gerhardt (6 December 1901 – 12 August 1956) was a German long-distance runner. He competed in the marathon at the 1928 Summer Olympics.

References

1901 births
1956 deaths
Athletes (track and field) at the 1928 Summer Olympics
German male long-distance runners
German male marathon runners
Olympic athletes of Germany
Sportspeople from Hanover
20th-century German people